The Effects of Nuclear War is a 1978 book commissioned by the United States Office of Technology Assessment to support civilian preparation for nuclear warfare. The book argued that the social effects of a nuclear attack would be unpredictable, and also, that the welfare of society would worsen for years after the attack.

The book contains a short story titled Charlottesville as an addendum. The fictional story describes a nuclear attack on the United States and describes Charlottesville, Virginia as a typical American town far from the attack where the people react to the news. The short story came to be popular on its own, separated from the full government report. The story was an inspiration for the 1983 movie, The Day After. The story is in the public domain.

References

External links
full text at Internet Archive

Charlottesville, Virginia
Works about cities in the United States
Fiction about nuclear war and weapons
Virginia in fiction
Books about nuclear issues
Books about war
1978 books